ICOM is a Danish mobile virtual network operator and broadbands network operator.

History

Founded in 1995, ICOM (ICOM Networks) was the first Danish company to create, design, service and deliver complete wide area network-solutions (WAN) for public Danish institutions, be it municipalities and national administrative bodies. Since then ICOM has become a provider of WAN and more recently in IP telephony.

Through its wholly owned Danish SIP MVNO ICOM Tele provides coverage of telecom services; broadband, mobile/fixed telephony over IP, wholesale carrier traffic and other value-adding services.

Product portfolio
The core product of the unified communication platform is dubbed ICOM Suite and collects communication critical components for end customers. ICOM Suite is essentially a natural expansion for a MVNO to provide for its end customers.

Connection to MNOs
ICOM is technically connected to two Danish MNOs:
 TDC
 Telenor

Telecommunications companies of Denmark
Technology companies based in Copenhagen
Danish companies established in 1995
Mobile virtual network operators